The 1812 United States presidential election in Virginia took place between October 30 and December 2, 1812, as part of the 1812 United States presidential election. Voters chose 25 representatives, or electors to the Electoral College, who voted for President and Vice President.

Virginia voted for the Democratic-Republican candidate and incumbent president, James Madison. Madison won Virginia, his home state, by a margin of 46.2%.

The race in the state was noteworthy for a dispute within the Federalist Party, who had formed an unofficial pact to support rebel Democratic-Republican candidate DeWitt Clinton nationwide, while putting up Federalist candidate Jared Ingersoll as Clinton's running-mate. The Virginia state Federalist Party rejected this pact, however, and instead nominated Rufus King, the party's vice-presidential candidate in the two previous elections, for president, while nominating William Richardson Davie as King's running-mate. Despite the state's substantial number of presidential electors and the closeness of the race nationally, the dispute did not have a major impact on the election's outcome, as Madison was never considered likely to lose his home state.

References

Virginia
1812